Yum Yum Bedlam is the sixteenth studio album by American hip hop duo Insane Clown Posse, and their fifth Joker Card in the Second Deck of the Dark Carnival Saga. It was released on October 31, 2021, on Psychopathic Records.

Background
On October 5, 2020, during ICP's House Party Peep Show live stream, Violent J, Shaggy 2 Dope, and Jumpsteady held a seminar revealing the name of the upcoming album. They also played the preview of the first single of the album "Ding Ding Doll". The album was followed up by three extended play albums that are six-to-seven songs each. 

It was also announced after all three EPs have been released, they will release a full album of the EPs combined, called The Seeds of Yum Yum. The first EP Yum Yum's Lure was released on Juggalo Day, February 17, 2021. Plans eventually changed, and "Ding Ding Doll" did not end up on the album, instead appearing only on the aforementioned EP Yum Yum's Lure. The full-length album Yum Yum Bedlam was instead released with all-new material on October 31, 2021. The album's booklet mentioned three additional EPs that will be released in 2022 (Wicked Vic the Weed, Pug Ugly the Stink Bud, and Woh the Weepin Weirdo).

Track listing

Charts

References

2021 albums
Insane Clown Posse albums
Psychopathic Records albums